Timsky District is an administrative and municipal district (raion), one of the twenty-eight in Kursk Oblast, Russia. It is located in the east of the oblast. Its administrative center is the urban locality (a work settlement) of Tim. Population:  14,628 (2002 Census);  The population of Tim accounts for 30.0% of the district's total population.

References

Notes

Sources

Districts of Kursk Oblast